Aqa Jeri (also Romanized as Āqā Jerī and Āqā Jarī; also known as Aghajan, Āgha Jāri, and Āghājerī) is a village in Howmeh Rural District, in the Central District of Divandarreh County, Kurdistan Province, Iran. At the 2006 census, its population was 429, in 91 families. The village is populated by Kurds.

References 

Towns and villages in Divandarreh County
Kurdish settlements in Kurdistan Province